The Latvian Men's Curling Championship is the national championship of men's curling in Latvia. It has been held annually since 2002. It is organized by the Latvian Curling Association.

List of champions
(Team line-up in order: skip (marked bold), third, second, lead, alternate(s), coach)

References

See also
Latvian Women's Curling Championship
Latvian Mixed Curling Championship
Latvian Mixed Doubles Curling Championship
Latvian Junior Curling Championships

Curling competitions in Latvia

National curling championships
Recurring sporting events established in 2002
2002 establishments in Latvia
Curling